The 2009–10 Alaska Aces season was the 24th season of the franchise in the Philippine Basketball Association (PBA).

Key dates
August 2: The 2009 PBA Draft took place in Fort Bonifacio, Taguig.

Draft picks

Roster

Philippine Cup

Eliminations

Standings

Game log

Eliminations

|- bgcolor="#bbffbb" 
| 1
| October 14
| Barako Bull
| 99–82
| Miller (19)
| Miller (11)
| Miller (12)
| Araneta Coliseum
| 1–0
|- bgcolor="#bbffbb" 
| 2
| October 17
| San Miguel
| 85–74
| Miller (25)
| Miller (10)
| Miller, Tenorio, dela Cruz (3)
| Panabo, Davao del Norte
| 2–0
|- bgcolor="#bbffbb" 
| 3
| October 23
| Coca Cola
| 100–79
| Tenorio (17)
| Miller, dela Cruz (10)
| Tenorio, Hugnatan, dela Cruz (4)
| Cuneta Astrodome
| 3–0
|- bgcolor="#bbffbb" 
| 4
| October 25
| Barangay Ginebra
| 105–96
| Hugnatan (26)
| Thoss (10)
| Cariaso (3)
| Araneta Coliseum
| 4–0

|- bgcolor="#bbffbb" 
| 5
| November 4
| Sta. Lucia
| 91–83
| Miller (19)
| Devance (11)
| Tenorio (6)
| Araneta Coliseum
| 5–0
|- bgcolor="#bbffbb" 
| 6
| November 6
| Burger King
| 87–73
| Miller (19)
| Tenorio (10)
| Cablay (5)
| Cuneta Astrodome
| 6–0
|- bgcolor="#edbebf" 
| 7
| November 13
| Rain or Shine
| 81–86
| Devance (24)
| Miller (11)
| Thoss (4)
| Ynares Center
| 6–1
|- bgcolor="#bbffbb" 
| 8
| November 20
| Talk 'N Text
| 110–106
| Miller (20)
| Miller, dela Cruz (7)
| Tenorio (6)
| Araneta Coliseum
| 7–1
|- bgcolor="#bbffbb"
| 9
| November 22
| Purefoods
| 101–87
| Tenorio (24)
| dela Cruz (7)
| Tenorio, 2 others (4)
| Araneta Coliseum
| 8–1
|- bgcolor="#bbffbb"
| 10
| November 29
| Barako Bull
| 99–88
| Hugnatan (17)
| Hugnatan (10)
| Miller (11)
| Ynares Sports Arena
| 9–1

|- bgcolor="#bbffbb"
| 11
| December 9
| San Miguel
| 122–116 (OT)
| Tenorio (27)
| Hugnatan (11)
| Devance (7)
| Araneta Coliseum
| 10–1
|- bgcolor="#bbffbb" 
| 12
| December 16
| Talk 'N Text
| 119–113 (OT)
| Miller (22)
| Devance, Tenorio (8)
| Tenorio (5)
| Araneta Coliseum
| 11–1
|- bgcolor="#edbebf"
| 13
| December 20
| Coca Cola
| 92–103
| Miller (17)
| Hugnatan (8)
| Devance, Tenorio (4)
| Araneta Coliseum
| 11–2

|- bgcolor="#edbebf"
| 14
| January 9
| Barangay Ginebra
| 90–93
| Miller (29)
| dela Cruz (8)
| Miller, Fonacier (4)
| Batangas City
| 11–3
|- bgcolor="#bbffbb" 
| 15
| January 13
| Sta. Lucia
| 85–77
| Devance (17)
| Thoss (14)
| Hugnatan (6)
| Araneta Coliseum
| 12–3
|- bgcolor="#edbebf"
| 16
| January 15
| Purefoods
| 77–94
| Devance (14)
| Devance (8)
| Miller (5)
| Araneta Coliseum
| 12–4
|- bgcolor="#edbebf"
| 17
| January 20
| Burger King
| 80–87
| Miller (19)
| Devance (11)
| Devance (6)
| Ynares Center
| 12–5
|- bgcolor="#bbffbb" 
| 18
| January 22
| Rain or Shine
| 95–94
| Miller (23)
| Hugnatan, Thoss (11)
| Tenorio (6)
| Ynares Center
| 13–5

Playoffs

|- bgcolor="#bbffbb" 
| 1
| February 10
| Barangay Ginebra
| 104–79
| Thoss (21)
| Devance (18)
| Tenorio (6)
| Araneta Coliseum
| 1–0
|- bgcolor="#bbffbb" 
| 2
| February 12
| Barangay Ginebra
| 90–82
| Miller (18)
| dela Cruz (16)
| Miller (7)
| Cuneta Astrodome
| 2–0
|- bgcolor="#bbffbb" 
| 3
| February 14
| Barangay Ginebra
| 91–88
| Tenorio, dela Cruz (15)
| dela Cruz (15)
| Tenorio (4)
| Araneta Coliseum
| 3–0
|- bgcolor="#bbffbb" 
| 4
| February 17
| Barangay Ginebra
| 102–95
| Tenorio (20)
| Hugnatan (10)
| Tenorio (10)
| Araneta Coliseum
| 4–0

|-bgcolor="#edbebf" 
| 1
| February 24
| Purefoods
| 77–81
| Miller (23)
| Thoss (14)
| Hugnatan, Miller (4)
| Araneta Coliseum
| 0–1
|-bgcolor="#edbebf" 
| 2
| February 26
| Purefoods
| 85–86
| Tenorio (19)
| Devance (10)
| Miller, Tenorio (5)
| Araneta Coliseum
| 0–2
|-bgcolor="#edbebf" 
| 3
| February 28
| Purefoods
| 78–79
| Miller (20)
| Devance (10)
| Miller, Tenorio (5)
| Araneta Coliseum
| 0–3
|-bgcolor="#edbebf" 
| 4
| March 3
| Purefoods
| 76–86
| Thoss (19)
| Thoss (12)
| Tenorio (6)
| Araneta Coliseum
| 0–4

Fiesta Conference

Eliminations

Standings

Game log

Transactions

Pre-season

Fiesta Conference

Trades

Imports recruited

References

Alaska Aces (PBA) seasons
Alaska